The Kootenai County Courthouse, located at 501 Government Way in Coeur d'Alene, is the county courthouse serving Kootenai County, Idaho. The courthouse was built in 1925–26. Spokane architect Julius A. Zittle designed the Georgian Revival building. A portico at the entrance features an entablature, frieze, and balcony supported by two Doric columns. The second-floor front windows are arched and have terra cotta ornamentation; brick pilasters separate the windows. The building is topped by a cornice and a brick parapet; a decorative Idaho state seal is located on the parapet above the entrance.

The courthouse was added to the National Register of Historic Places on December 23, 1977.

References

External links

Courthouses on the National Register of Historic Places in Idaho
Georgian Revival architecture in Idaho
Government buildings completed in 1926
Buildings and structures in Coeur d'Alene, Idaho
County courthouses in Idaho
National Register of Historic Places in Kootenai County, Idaho